The first Speaker of the House of Assembly of the Bahamas was in 1729 following the establishment of the General Assembly started by Woodes Roger. The first Speaker was John Colebrooke.

List of speakers

References

Speakers
 
Bahamas